Jean Morin (born August 10, 1963) is a Canadian retired National Hockey League linesman who wore uniform number 97.

Career 
Morin joined the NHL as an official at the start of the 1991–92 season. During his career, he officiated in the Stanley Cup Finals in 2002,  and the 2010 Winter Olympics. He is a vice president of the National Hockey League Officials Association.

References

1963 births
Canadian ice hockey officials
French Quebecers
Ice hockey people from Quebec
Living people
National Hockey League officials
Sportspeople from Sorel-Tracy